This article gives an overview of liberalism in Turkey. Liberalism was introduced in the Ottoman Empire during the Tanzimat period of reformation.

History

On 30 May 1876, Murad V became the Sultan when his uncle Abdülaziz was deposed. He was highly influenced by French culture and was a liberal. He reigned for 93 days before being deposed on the grounds that he was supposedly mentally ill on 31 August 1876; however his opponents may simply have used those grounds to stop his implementation of democratic reforms. As a result, he was unable to deliver the Constitution that his supporters had sought.

Constitutional era 
Constitutionalism was introduced in the Ottoman Empire by liberal intellectuals like Beşir Fuad, Hekim Ismail Pasha, and Ahmed Zühdü Pasha, who tried to modernize their society by promoting development, progress, and liberal values.

Tanzimât 
The Tanzimât, literally meaning reorganization of the Ottoman Empire (see Nizam), was a period of reformation that began in 1839 and ended with the First Constitutional Era in 1876. Although the motives for the implementation of Tanzimât were bureaucratic, it was impulsed by liberal ministers and intellectuals like Dimitrios Zambakos Pasha, Kabuli Mehmed Pasha, the secret society Young Ottomans, and Midhat Pasha, who is also often considered one of the founders of the Ottoman Parliament. Many changes were made to improve civil liberties, but many Muslims saw them as foreign influence on the world of Islam. That perception complicated reformist efforts made by the state. A policy called Ottomanism was meant to unite all the different peoples living in Ottoman territories, "Muslim and non-Muslim, Turkish and Greek, Armenian and Jewish, Kurd and Arab". The policy officially began with the Edict of Gülhane of 1839, declaring equality before the law for both Muslim and non-Muslim Ottomans.

The Tanzimât reforms began under Sultan Mahmud II. On November 3, 1839, Sultan Abdulmejid I issued a hatt-i sharif or imperial edict called the Edict of Gülhane or Tanzimât Fermânı. This was followed by several statutes enacting its policies. In the edict the Sultan stated that he wished "to bring the benefits of a good administration to the provinces of the Ottoman Empire through new institutions." Among the reforms were the abolition of slavery and slave trade; the decriminalization of homosexuality; the establishment of the Civil Service School, an institution of higher learning for civilians the Press and Journalism Regulation Code; and the Nationality Law of 1869 creating a common Ottoman citizenship irrespective of religious or ethnic divisions; among others. Western educated economists like Ahmet Reşat Pasha advocated for economic liberalism.

Young Ottomans 

The Young Ottomans were a secret society established in 1865 by a group of Ottoman Turkish intellectuals who were dissatisfied with the Tanzimat reforms in the Ottoman Empire, which they believed did not go far enough, and wanted to end the autocracy in the empire. Young Ottomans sought to transform Ottoman society by preserving the empire and modernizing along the European tradition of adopting a constitutional government. Though the Young Ottomans were frequently in disagreement ideologically, they all agreed that the new constitutional government should continue to be somewhat rooted in Islam to emphasize "the continuing and essential validity of Islam as the basis of Ottoman political culture." However, they sincreticize Islamic idealism with modern liberalism and parliamentary democracy, to them the European parliamentary liberalism was a model to follow, in accordance with the tenets of Islam and "attempted to reconcile Islamic concepts of government with the ideas of Montesquieu, Danton, Rousseau, and contemporary European Scholars and statesmen." Namık Kemal, who was influential in the formation of the society, admired the constitution of the French Third Republic, he summed up the Young Ottomans' political ideals as "the sovereignty of the nation, the separation of powers, the responsibility of officials, personal freedom, equality, freedom of thought, freedom of press, freedom of association, enjoyment of property, sanctity of the home". The Young Ottomans believed that one of the principal reasons for the decline of the empire was abandoning Islamic principles in favor of imitating European modernity with unadvised compromises to both and they sought to unite the two in a way that they believed would best serve the interests of the state and its people. They sought to revitalize the empire by incorporating certain Europeans models of government, while still retaining the Islamic foundations the empire was founded on. Among the prominent members of this society were writers and publicists such as İbrahim Şinasi, Namık Kemal, Ali Suavi, Ziya Pasha, and Agah Efendi.

In 1876, the Young Ottomans had their defining moment when Sultan Abdülhamid II reluctantly promulgated the Ottoman constitution of 1876, the first attempt at a constitution in the Ottoman Empire, ushering in the First Constitutional Era. Although this period was short lived, with Abdülhamid ultimately suspending the constitution and parliament in 1878 in favor of a return to absolute monarchy with himself in power, the legacy and influence of the Young Ottomans continued to endure until the collapse of the empire. Several decades later, another group of reform-minded Ottomans, namely the Young Turks, repeated the Young Ottomans' efforts, leading to the Young Turk Revolution in 1908 and the beginning of the Second Constitutional Era.

Freedom and Accord Party

1911: As a reaction to dictatorial tendencies, the liberal Freedom and Accord Party (Hürriyet ve İtilaf Fırkası) is founded.
1913: The party is banned.

Ottoman Liberal People's Party / Freedom Party 
1918: Fethi Okyar founded in 1918 the Ottoman Liberal People's Party (Osmanlı Hürriyetperver Avam Fırkası).
1920: The party disappeared.
1930: In an attempt to allow a legal opposition party, Atatürk encouraged Okyar to found the Freedom Party (Hürriyet Fırkası), also rendered as Liberal Republican Party (Serbest Cumhuriyet Fırkası).
1930: The party attracted huge number of dissident people of the Kemalist bureaucracy's harsh policies. The founder of the party, Okyar, dissolved his own party, fearing that it was becoming a rallying ground for counter-reformists against the secular republic.

Freedom Party
1956: A liberal faction of the Democratic Party founded the Liberty Party (Hürriyet Partisi).
1958: The party merged into the Republican People's Party.

New Turkey Party
1961: A moderate faction of the former Democratic Party established after the ban of the latter party the New Turkey Party (Yeni Türkiye Partisi).
1973: After initial success the party became unsuccessful and is dissolved.

Liberal Democratic Party
1994: Founded on July 26 as Liberal Party by former (Demokrat Parti) members and Besim Tibuk, the first president.
1996: The Liberal Party changed its name to Liberal Democratic Party.
2002: Tibuk resigns as president on November 25.
2005: Cem Toker gets elected as president on July 20.
2017: Toker resigns as president on January 29. Gültekin Tırpancı gets elected as president on the same day.

See also 
 Secularism in Turkey
 White Turks
 Kemalism
 History of Turkey
 Politics of Turkey
 List of political parties in Turkey

References

 
Political movements in Turkey